Close Encounters may refer to:

 Close encounter, an event in which a person witnesses an unidentified flying object
 Close Encounter (album), an album by Franco Ambrosetti, 1978
 Close Encounters (Teddy Edwards and Houston Person album), 1999
 Close Encounters (Gene Page album), 1978
 Close Encounters, an episode of Naked Science

See also
 Close Encounters of the Third Kind, a 1977 American science fiction film by Steven Spielberg
 
 Alien Encounters (disambiguation)